Damian Rice (born 1961) is an Australian actor who has appeared in various Australian drama series, including  G.P., Fire, All Saints and Blue Heelers.

TV credits
Love Child (2014)
Power Games: The Packer-Murdoch War (2013)
Home and Away (2004-2011)
Rogue Nation (2009)
Out of the Blue (2008)
Temptation (TV movie) (2003)
All Saints (1999-2001)
Above the Law (2000)
The New Girlfriend (1999)
The Dark Redemption (Short) (1998)
Blue Heelers (1998)
Fire (1996)
G.P. (1994-1995)

Filmography
The Dark Redemption (1999 fanfilm)

Discography
 A Perfect Plan (2012)

References

External links

Australian male television actors
1961 births
Living people
Place of birth missing (living people)